Maciej Rybaczuk (born 27 November 1983 in Warsaw, Poland) is a Polish footballer who plays as a defender for Polish second-tier side Znicz Pruszków.

External links
 
 Player profile Znicz Pruszków 

1983 births
Living people
Znicz Pruszków players
Polish footballers
Footballers from Warsaw
Association football defenders